Rodney O'Gliasain Kennedy-Minott (sometimes spelled Rodney Glisan Kennedy-Minott; June 1, 1928 – December 15, 2004) was an American diplomat, Democratic Party activist and professor.

Early life
Kennedy-Minott was born in Portland, Oregon, on June 1, 1928. He served as a United States Army sergeant in Japan from 1946 until 52. He then studied at Stanford University, receiving his bachelor's in 1953, master's in 1956, and doctorate in 1960.

Academic career
From 1960 until 1965, Kennedy-Minott was assistant director of the Western civilization history program at Stanford University, before becoming associate professor at Portland State University. In 1966, he became associate dean of instruction at California State University, where he became a full professor of U.S. history in 1969. He was a senior lecturer in national security affairs at the Naval Postgraduate School until his retirement in 2002.

From 1971 until 1973, he advised Thames Television on European emigration to the United States, and served as a researcher for The World at War.

Political career
Kennedy-Minott worked on the 1964 United States Senate campaign of Pierre Salinger and the 1972 presidential campaign of George McGovern.

In 1976, Kennedy-Minott was chairman for the Northern California portion of Jimmy Carter's presidential campaign. In August 1977, Carter appointed him ambassador to Sweden, which he served as until September 1980. Carter was a close friend of Kennedy-Minott, and a frequent guest at his home in Atherton, California.

Personal life
Kennedy-Minott was married to Polly Fitzhugh Kennedy (1929-1997), but they had divorced before her death. They had two daughters (Katherine Pardow and Polly Berry) and a son (Rodney Glisan). Kennedy-Minott had three grandchildren (Cambria Minott-Gaines, William Weihnacht and Joseph Minott). He died from complications of pancreatitis on December 15, 2004.

Published works
Peerless Patriots: the Organized Veterans and the Spirit of Patriotism (1962)
The Fortress That Never Was: the Myth of Hitler's Bavarian Stronghold (1964)
The Sinking of the Lollipop: Shirley Temple vs. Pete McCloskey (1968)
U.S. Regional Force Application: the Maritime Strategy and its Effect on Nordic Stability (1988, Hoover Institution)

References

Ambassadors of the United States to Sweden
Stanford University Department of History faculty
1928 births
2004 deaths
20th-century American historians
20th-century American male writers
United States Army soldiers
Activists from Portland, Oregon
American male non-fiction writers
Deaths from pancreatitis